The ITF Women's Circuit is the second tier tour for women's professional tennis organised by the International Tennis Federation, and is a tier below the WTA Tour. The ITF Women's Circuit includes tournaments with prize money ranging from $10,000 up to $100,000.

This article covers the ITF tour from the month of April until June.

Schedule

Key

April

May

June

See also 
2008 ITF Women's Circuit (January–March)
2008 ITF Women's Circuit (July–September)

References

External links 
International Tennis Federation (ITF) official website

2008 ITF Women's Circuit 04-06